11th Infantry Regiment Station is a BTS Skytrain station, on the Sukhumvit Line in Bangkok, Thailand. It is located in front of the headquarters of the 11th Infantry Regiment of the Royal Thai Army. The station is part of the northern extension of the Sukhumvit Line and opened on 5 June 2020, as part of phase 3.

References

See also 

 Bangkok Skytrain

BTS Skytrain stations
Railway stations opened in 2020